The transumbilical plane or umbilical plane, one of the transverse planes in human anatomy, is a horizontal line that passes through the abdomen at the level of the navel (or umbilicus). In physical examination, clinicians use the transumbilical plane and its intersection with the median plane to divide the abdomen into four quadrants.

References

Animal anatomy
Anatomical planes